Poráč is a village and municipality in the Spišská Nová Ves District in the Košice Region of central-eastern Slovakia. The population was 1,036 in the 2001 census.

History
In historical records the village was first mentioned in 1358. Until 1918 under Hungarian rule, the village was called Poráčs.

Geography
The village lies at an altitude of 778 metres and covers an area of 18.853 km².
In 2011 had a population of 1020 inhabitants.

External links
http://en.e-obce.sk/obec/porac/porac.html
https://web.archive.org/web/20110226112651/http://app.statistics.sk/mosmis/eng/run.html
http://www.porac.sk

Villages and municipalities in Spišská Nová Ves District